Skalnaté Pleso may refer to:

 Skalnaté Pleso (lake), a lake in Slovakia
 Skalnaté Pleso Observatory, an astronomical observatory
 a shorthand for the Atlas Coeli Skalnate Pleso 1950.0, a popular sky atlas for amateur astronomers that was compiled at the observatory. It was reissued by Sky Publishing Corporation as the Skalnate Pleso Atlas of the Heavens.